Phyllonorycter schreberella is a moth of the family Gracillariidae. It is known from Europe, except northern Europe, Ireland and the Balkan Peninsula.

The wingspan is 6–8 mm. There are two generations per year with adults on wing in May and again in August.

The larvae feed on Ulmus glabra, Ulmus laevis, Ulmus minor and Ulmus pumila. They mine the leaves of their host plant. They create a short, roundish to oval, somewhat inflated, lower surface tentiform mine, often crossing a lateral vein. The epidermis has several lengthwise folds. Pupation takes place in a tough, greenish cocoon which lies freely in the mine.

References

External links
 

schreberella
Moths described in 1781
Moths of Europe
Taxa named by Johan Christian Fabricius